Imago is a Filipino rock band composed of Kharren "Kurei" Granada (vocals), Myrene "Maps" Academia (bass), Tim Cacho (guitar), Zach Lucero (guitar) and Mervin Panganiban (drums).

History
Imago was formed in 1997 With Aia de Leon on vocals and rhythm guitar, Tim Cacho on lead guitar, Arvin Gatmaitan on bass and back up vocals, Zach Lucero on drums and London-born Michelle Pritchard on violin. After their tribal-sounding track entitled "Rainsong" spent considerable time being played on NU107's In The Raw, a program for independent bands in the country, it eventually graduated into the station's mainstream playlist.  They were then signed a recording contract with Viva Records and were able to record their debut album entitled, Probably Not But Most Definitely under the helm of producer/musician Bob Aves and Grace Nono. The album was released in June 27, 2001 and included 19 tracks which included their pre-album songs like "Rainsong" and "Alay" as well as an electronica remix of "Rainsong" by friend and musician (former Eraserheads drummer) Raimund Marasigan under the Squid 9 nom de musique.  The album was highly regarded by the alternative industry for their courage to take on a Celtic/World Music feel in their music rather than the rap-growl (fondly known as "Hupaw" by most music critics) scene that was growing at the time, as well as the poetic approach to their lyrics.

The band has picked up a handful of Katha and NU107 Rock Awards (Best Female Award for Aia De Leon and Best Music Video for "Akap") from the first cd. All this while maintaining a consistent public presence around Metro Manila, playing in various venues with other bands in the lineup as well as part of various production events such as Admit One and Sunday Grabe Sunday.  During this time, Aia also joined the all-girl alt-pop band Fatal Posporos, as a bassist, replacing their original member Annette Ortiz who left for the United States and now a member of the newly reformed Filipino band, Prettier than Pink.

Around this time period, bassist Arvin Gatmaitan and violinist Michelle Pritchard parted ways with the band. Arvin played with progressive metal band Eternal Now and is currently pursuing a business career. Michelle followed her other passion, race car driving and became a regular competitor in the Philippine motorsports scene. Michelle was also hosting the NBC TV show, Auto Review and was associate editor for C! Magazine. Michelle was briefly married to Wolfgang drummer, Wolf Gemora and has now returned to her London roots and is now married to Irish-born Kevin Byrne with whom she has two young boys. Michelle's signature Celtic-influenced violin strokes were missed by many early fans as Imago's sound morphed into mainstream pop shortly after Myrene Academia, former NU107 DJ and Sandwich bassist joined the band.

Imago's second album was released 2 years after, though they had been playing most of their new material during gigs.  Recorded in 2003, the CD's release was delayed by unexpected record label setbacks and was thus aptly titled Take 2 which was clearly a reflection of the band's second attempt in releasing an album. The material is relatively heavier compared to the first album, trading in the ethereal cum New Age sensibilities with a modern pop rock flavor, even incorporating rap along with the staccato-type of singing they had been known for. Released independently, Take 2 featured hit songs such as Akap and Anino  [2]. Take 2 produced the new sound and gave the band a wider audience, having been played in some mainstream CHR (Current Hit Radio) format stations. "Taning" was also included in the soundtrack to the Peque Gallaga comeback experimental film, Pinoy Blonde.

In 2006, Imago released their third album, "Blush" under Universal Records. with "Taralets" as the lead single which was one of the certified hits of 2006 in the radio and music video channels. The song was also used as a theme song for the movie "Pitong Dalagita" and as a campaign jingle for a Philippine senatorial candidate. In the same year, they recorded a revival of Ewan, which was originally sung by the APO Hiking Society. In 2007, they earned a nomination for Favorite Artist in the 2007 MYX Music Awards. They also released their second single of their "Blush" album, "Sundo". The music video was directed by Marie Jamora which was also the director for their previous videos, Akap and Taralets.

After the success of the third single Walang Misteryo, their fourth single, entitled "Under Repair" was recently released. The video of the latest single features the band impersonating ABBA.

"Blush" has also been certified Gold Record in the Philippines January 2008, for reaching 15,000 copies,  shortly after the release of the album's Special Edition CD.

In March 2008, the band was invited to be one of the many other artists from all over the world to perform in the annual Mosaic Music Festival in Singapore. Lead vocalist Aia de Leon, also shared vocal duties with Broken Social Scene's Kevin Drew during his band's opening number at the same event.

In 2010, Imago released its fourth album entitled "Effect Desired None" with "Huling Yakap Ng Mundo" as the lead single.

In April 2013, lead vocalist Aia de Leon left the band. On September 13, it was announced that Mayumi Gomez would be the band's new lead vocalist.

On June 25, 2014, Imago released its Kapit album. With 8 tracks on the album, Imago fans recognized the familiar sound of the group they were accustomed to. The album is produced by Raimund Marasigan of Sandwich and Eraserheads fame.

The beginning of 2019 brought about the departure of Mayumi from Imago due to her move to the US to focus on her new life as a wife. Kiara San Luis takes over as the vocalist of the band.

Members
Current members
Kharren "Kurei" Granada– lead vocals (2022–present)
Myrene Academia – bass guitar, backing vocals (1997–present)
Tim Cacho – lead guitar (1997–present)
Zach Lucero – lead and rhythm guitar, backing vocals, occasional drums and percussion (1997–present)
Mervin Panganiban – drums and percussion (2013–present)

Former members
Aia de Leon – lead vocals, guitars (1997–2013)
Michelle Pritchard – violin (1997–2002)
Arvin Gatmaitan – bass guitar (1997)
Mayumi Gomez - lead vocals, keyboards (2013–2019)
Kiara San Luis – lead vocals, guitar (2019–2022)

Discography

Probably Not But Most Definitely (2001)
Pretty me
Pauna
Rainsong
Bathala
The Box
Tugon
Hiwaga
On Shadows & Tendencies
Do
Alay
Salitoo
Otherwise
Idlip
Salitree
Unwed
Wishlist
Laya
18
(Bonus Track) Rainsong Remix

Take 2 (2004)
Freefall
Phoenix
Akap
Bihag
Taning
Anino
Reset
Gratitude
One Way
Soft Return
Rush
Roasted Anino Mix (Bonus track)
Preset/Reset (Bonus track)
Taning/Mahal kong Kalaguyo (Bonus track)
Taning/Ipagpatuloy ang Kasalanan (Bonus track)

Blush (2006)
Zelo
Lula
Sundo
Under Repair
Highway
Lights Out
Last Dance
Closer
Taralets
Walang Mysteryo
So Be It
S.R.O

Effect Desired None (2010)
Bawal
Ang Huling Yakap Ng Mundo
Sutil
Sa Ngalan Mo
Yahoo
Effects Desired None
Premonition
Can I
Sagad
Spare Change Glitter

Kapit (2015)
Kapit
Nagkalimutan
Then was Forever
Summer Baby
Sa Wala
Malaya
Then Was Forever (Remix)
Kapit (Remix)

Miscellaneous
Spolarium - Ultraelectromagneticjam!: The Music Of The Eraserheads
Ewan - Kami nAPO muna
Let It Snow - Close Up Season of Smiles
Umagang Kay Ganda - Theme Song for ABS-CBN's "Umagang Kay Ganda" morning program
Love is in my hair (OST for the CineMalaya Film entry PISAY)
Show Me Your Smile - Kami nAPO muna ulit
Taralets - Theme Song for Pitong Dalagita
Blue Kiss (song) - Cover song (Promotional Purposes only)

Collaborations of Imago
Ultraelectromagneticjam!: The Music Of The Eraserheads (Sony BMG Music Philippines, 2005)
ROK ON! (Viva Records, 2005)
Kami nAPO muna (Universal Records, 2006)
Super! The Biggest Opm Hits Of The Year (Universal Records, 2006)
Pinoy Ako 2 (Star Music, 2006)
Kami nAPO muna ulit (Universal Records, 2007)
The OPM Love Album (Universal Records, 2008)
Super Astig Hits (Universal Records, 2016)

Awards and nominations

References

External links
Official Yahoogroups

Filipino rock music groups
Universal Records (Philippines) artists
Musical groups from Quezon City
Musical groups established in 1997
1997 establishments in the Philippines
Female-fronted musical groups